Herbert (Lefty) Karpel (December 27, 1917 – January 24, 1995) was a Major League Baseball pitcher. In 2 career games, he had a 0–0 record, with a 10.80 ERA. He batted and threw left-handed.

Karpel was born in Brooklyn, New York, attended Richmond Hill High School in Queens, New York, died in San Diego, California, and was Jewish.

References

External links

1917 births
1995 deaths
Baseball players from New York (state)
Jewish American baseball players
Jewish Major League Baseball players
Major League Baseball pitchers
New York Yankees players
Sportspeople from Brooklyn
Baseball players from New York City
20th-century American Jews